Ostakhovo is a rural locality (a selo) in Kubenskoye Rural Settlement, Vologodsky District, Vologda Oblast, Russia. The population was 543 as of 2002. There are 6 streets.

Geography 
Ostakhovo is located 40 km northwest of Vologda (the district's administrative centre) by road. Pavlovo is the nearest rural locality.

References 

Rural localities in Vologodsky District